The Forgotten Toys is a 1997-1999 British animated comedy television series based on the children's book The Night After Christmas. It was made by Hibbert Ralph Entertainment, featuring the voices of Joanna Lumley and Bob Hoskins. It is a poignant tale of abandoned toys who are searching for children to love them. It aired on CITV in the UK, on ABC in Australia.

Characters
Teddy (voiced by Bob Hoskins) - A bad-tempered scruffy bear. Sometimes he moans about everything and whenever he passes or sees green vegetables, he exclaims in disgust; "Sprouts!. I hate sprouts!". In the episode called "Baby", he is forced to eat Brussels sprouts, but he spits them out in disgust. He also usually gets into trouble.
Annie (voiced by Joanna Lumley; Shelley Thompson (American redub)) - A feisty, kind, wise, honourable, jolly, and take-charge rag doll. When she is in charge of Teddy, she usually tries to keep him out of trouble. She is often interested in and curious about several things, and is willing to help those on need. Teddy often calls her "Pigtails".
Chauncey (voiced by Clement Freud; Bob Sessions (American redub)) - An old, gray stray dog. He only appears in 'The Night After Christmas' and becomes a good friend who gives them a place to stay.
Keef (voiced by Andrew Sachs) - The thin and tall male burglar of the two. He wears a blue jacket, a flat cap, thin trousers and a red waistcoat. He gets very stern with his wife Kath, and sometimes he gets very moody and bored, Keef is one of the main antagonists of the show.
Kath (voiced by Kate Sachs) - The fat female burglar. She wears a green coat, a yellow beanier, a yellow scarf and pink fingerless gloves. She gets very scared, anxious and nervous about anything to do with her husband Keef. Kath is another of the main antagonists of the show.

Episodes

History
"The Forgotten Toys" was first shown on 26 December 1995, and was later repeated on Living's Tiny Living block. Numerous videos were released in or around 1995 and 1996 and a couple of DVDs followed in 2002. "The Forgotten Toys" has now been long considered dissolved, though 'the end' of the series was never officially announced. The Christmas special aired on the Fox Family Channel in the United States in 1998 in where Annie and Chauncey's voices were redubbed.

See also
 List of Christmas films

References

External links

 

Silver Fox Films

1995 British television series debuts
1999 British television series endings
1990s British children's television series
British children's animated adventure television series
British children's animated comedy television series
British children's animated fantasy television series
ITV children's television shows
Sentient toys in fiction
British television shows based on children's books
Television series by Universal Television
Television series by ITV Studios
Television shows produced by Meridian Broadcasting
English-language television shows
Animated television series about bears